was a Japanese ryūkōka and enka singer, songwriter, and electric guitarist. His debut song  was released in 1939. Along with enka-shi Haruo Oka's 1939 debut, his debut had a big impact on Japanese popular music because Japanese popular ryūkōka music of that time was mainly sung by classical music singers such as Ichiro Fujiyama and Noriko Awaya. He was born in Matsusaka, Mie prefecture, Japan.

Discography 
  : 1939
  : 1941
  : 1962
  : 1975
  : 1994
  : 1998 (Tribute song to Taro Shoji born in 1898)
  : 2001

References 

1919 births
2013 deaths
Enka singers
Japanese male singer-songwriters
Japanese singer-songwriters
Japanese guitarists
Musicians from Mie Prefecture
20th-century Japanese musicians
20th-century guitarists
20th-century Japanese male singers
20th-century Japanese singers